Parmena solieri is a species of beetle in the family Cerambycidae. It was described by Mulsant in 1839. It is known from France, Sardinia, Corsica, Italy, the Balearic Islands, and Spain.

Subspecies
 Parmena solieri breuningi Vives, 1979
 Parmena solieri solieri Mulsant, 1839

References

Parmenini
Beetles described in 1839